Sheffield Apartments is a historic apartment building located at Harrisburg, Dauphin County, Pennsylvania.  It was built in 1925, and is a three-story, rectangular brick building in the Mission Revival style.  The facade is three bays wide, and it features three story bay windows on each side of the center entrance bay.  It has 14 apartments.

It was added to the National Register of Historic Places in 1990.

References

Buildings and structures in Harrisburg, Pennsylvania
Residential buildings on the National Register of Historic Places in Pennsylvania
Residential buildings completed in 1925
Apartment buildings in Pennsylvania
National Register of Historic Places in Harrisburg, Pennsylvania